Hen Island may refer to:

 Hen Island (Connecticut)
 Hen Island (Maryland)
 Hen Island (Ontario)
 Hen Island (Tasmania)
 Hen Island, County Down, a townland in County Down, Northern Ireland
 Hen Island, Taranga Island, one of the Hen and Chicken Islands, New Zealand